This list comprises all players who have participated in at least one league match for Portland Timbers since the USL began keeping archived records in 2003. Players who were on the roster but never played a first team game are not listed; players who appeared for the team in other competitions (US Open Cup, etc.) but never actually made an USL appearance are noted at the bottom of the page where appropriate.

A "†" denotes players who appeared in only a single match.A "*" denotes players who are known to have appeared for the team prior to 2003.

A
  Chugger Adair*
  Vardan Adzemian†
  Fadi Afash
  Hugo Alcaraz-Cuellar
  Kalif Alhassan
  Byron Alvarez
  Jaime Ambriz
  Dan Antoniuk
  Memo Arzate

B
  Ivan Becerra †
  Mark Baena*
  Chris Bagley
  Chad Bartlomé
  Scott Benedetti
  Alex Bengard
  Rees Bettinger*
  Scott Bower*
  Manuel Brasil*
  Adin Brown †
  Chris Brown
  Josh Brown
  Oral Bullen
  Salim Bullen
  Ray Burse
  Jose Burciaga*
  Cole Burgman*

C
  Josh Cameron
  Mike Chabala
  Mubarike Chisoni
  Matt Chulis*
  Johan Claesson
  Jeff Clarke*
  Paul Conway
  Keith Costigan*
  Steve Cronin
  Erik Cronkrite

D
  Mamadou Danso
  Noah Delgado*
  Doug DeMartin
  Bright Dike
  Neil Dombrowski
  Nick Downing*
  Cameron Dunn

E
  Bayard Elfvin

F
  Brian Farber
  Kevin Forrest

G
  Derek Gaudet
  Kevin Goldthwaite
  Jacobi Goodfellow
  Alan Gordon
  Andrew Gregor
  Leonard Griffin
  Miguel Guante
  Alejandro Gutierrez

H
  David Hague
  Luc Harrington
  Chase Harrison
  David Hayes
  Aaron Heinzen
  David Henning
  Shaun Higgins
  Greg Howes*
  Martin Hutton

I
  Sergio Iñiguez

J
  Antouman Jallow
  Jordan James
  Bryan Jordan
  George Josten
  Ian Joy

K
  Mandjou Keita
  Tim Karalexis
  Stephen Keel
  Brian Kelly*†
  Ehren Kilian *
  Quavas Kirk
  Brad Knighton
  Cameron Knowles
  Luke Kreamalmeyer

L
  Kiki Lara
  Kevin Legg *
  Darin Lewis *
  Aaran Lines
  Bryan Little
  Rodrigo López

M
  James Marcelin
  Garrett Marcum
  Drew McAthy
  Sean McAuley *
  Jason McLaughlin
  Tony McManus
  Tony McPeak *
  Kevin Meissner
  Jason Melendez *
  Edwin Miranda
  Yuri Morales
  Lee Morrison
  Dan Moss *†
  Ibad Muhamadu

N
  Matt Napoleon *
  Alex Nimo
  Takuro Nishimura
  Michael Nsien

O
  O. J. Obatola
  Jesús Ochoa *
  Arsène Oka
  Lawrence Olum
  Michael O'Neill *

P
  Tom Poltl
  Ryan Pore
  Steve Purdy
  Matt Pyzdrowski

R
  Mike Randolph
  Troy Ready
  Bryn Ritchie
  Chris Roner*
  Neil Ryan*

S
  Jake Sagare
  Brent Sancho *
  Josh Saunders
  Shawn Saunders
  Keith Savage
  Darren Sawatzky*
  Chris Seitz  
  Ronnie Silva
  Chris Smith*†
  Ross Smith
  Ben Somoza*
  Curtis Spiteri*
  Takayuki Suzuki

T
  Matt Taylor
  Tom Taylor
  McKinley Tennyson
  Justin Thompson
  Scot Thompson
  Vadim Tolstolutsky*
  Benjamin Totori

V
  Jake Vaughn
  Brian Visser †

W
  Jamil Walker
  Jarrod Weis
  Josh Wicks
  Gavin Wilkinson
  Adam Wilson
  Brian Winters

Y
  Ryan Youngblood

Others
  Scott Bolkan - Bolkan never made a league appearance for Portland, but did play for them in the U.S. Open Cup in 2008.

See also
 All-time Portland Timbers (MLS) roster -- equivalent list for this team's Major League Soccer successor

Sources

Portland Timbers
 
Association football player non-biographical articles